The Joe Schmo Show is an American reality television hoax show created by Paul Wernick and Rhett Reese.  The series premiered in the United States on Spike on September 2, 2003.  The show's third season premiered on January 8, 2013.

Series overview
{| class="wikitable" style="text-align:center"
|-
! style="padding: 0px 8px" colspan="2" rowspan="2"| Season
! style="padding: 0px 8px" rowspan="2"| Episodes
! colspan=2| Originally aired
|-
! style="padding: 0px 8px"| Season premiere
! style="padding: 0px 8px"| Season finale
|-
| bgcolor="#CF1020"|
 |1
 |10
 |
 |
|-
| bgcolor="#FFBF00"|
 |2
 |9
 |
 |
|-
| bgcolor="#4CBB17"|
 |3
 |10
 |
 |
|-
|}

Episodes

Season 1 (2003)

Season 2 (2004)

Season 3 (2013)

References

External links
 
 

Lists of American non-fiction television series episodes